Descriptive Psychology (DP) is primarily a conceptual framework for the science of psychology. Created in its original form by Peter G. Ossorio at the University of Colorado at Boulder in the mid-1960s, it has subsequently been the subject of hundreds of books and papers that have updated, refined, and elaborated it, and that have applied it to domains such as psychotherapy, artificial intelligence, organizational communities, spirituality, research methodology, and theory creation.

The nature of descriptive psychology

A conceptual framework
Descriptive Psychology is the intellectual discipline that makes explicit the implicit structure of the behavioral sciences. It concerns conceptual, pre-empirical and theory-neutral formulations identifying the full range of a subject matter. The concern with full inclusion, with clarifying the full set of possibilities, is a hallmark of Descriptive Psychology.
The pre-empirical work is accomplished by identifying and interrelating the essential concepts, the vital distinctions, that characterize all possible instances of a subject matter.  The empirical project, on the other hand, involves finding the specific possibilities and patterns that actually occur. Descriptive Psychology separates the conceptual and empirical from the theoretical.

Descriptive Psychology explicates the Person Concept as the fundamental structure of the behavioral sciences. The Person Concept is a single, coherent concept which involves the interrelated concepts of Individual Person, Behavior, Language and World. Descriptive Psychology establishes rules of construction, composition and relationship that articulate how these concepts are interconnected. 

The original impulse for the creation of DP was dissatisfaction with mainstream approaches to the science of psychology. Of particular importance was the perception that psychology had paid insufficient attention to the  pre-empirical matters essential to good science, and especially to the creation of a foundational conceptual framework such as other sciences possessed. Later authors noted that this lack of a conceptual scaffolding was responsible for the fragmentation of psychology; i.e. for its lack of any unifying, broadly accepted "standard model."

A parallel example from another science may be helpful in understanding the nature of DP. Isaac Newton, before he could integrate a large number of empirical findings in his famous theory, had to attend to a number of pre-empirical matters. He had to import some existing mathematics and to create a whole new branch of mathematics, calculus. Further, and most relevant here, he required a new conceptual system—a set of systematically related concepts such as "force", "mass" and "acceleration"—before and in order to make the discriminations necessary to lodge any empirical claim. How could one observe or claim, for example, that a "force" was inversely proportional to the distance between two objects if one did not first have the concept of "force" (a concept which Newton himself formulated)?

Newton's conceptual system was designed to permit the description of any fact (e.g., the orbit of the moon yesterday) or possible fact (e.g., the orbit of a newly discovered planet tomorrow) about the motions of large objects. In the same way, DP was created by Ossorio as a set of systematically related distinctions designed to enable one to describe any fact (e.g. Jack's behavior yesterday) or possible fact (e.g., Jill's behavior tomorrow) about persons and their behavior. As conceptual distinctions, its concepts are not true, false, verifiable, or falsifiable; but instead represent pre-empirical requirements for empirical questions to be posed and theories generated. They provide a means for describing, distinguishing and categorizing any fact or possible fact concerning persons and their behavior. Finally, DP is not a theory to be tested, but, like English grammar or arithmetic, a system to be used—here, in the conduct of psychological science and application. Criticism of the system would take the form, not of empirical disconfirmation, but of showing that DP's concepts were not apt, useful, and/or systematically related in a logical, rigorous fashion.

Some core concepts of descriptive psychology
DP comprises a vast network of concepts, but two of the most important in the field are those of "behavior" and of "person".

The concept of "behavior"

In the mainstream view, the typical understanding of the term "behavior" is that it is "any observable overt movement of the organism generally taken to include verbal behavior as well as physical movements". Behavior is essentially observable, measurable movement in space: a pigeon pecks a disk; a man raises his right hand, palm forward, to the side of his head; a woman utters the phrase "Hi, how are you?". Such movement may then be explained, depending on the theorist, as caused by environmental contingencies, "inner" entities such as thoughts or motives, or biological states of affairs. However caused, the behavior itself is the "observable overt movement of the organism."

From the DP point of view, this conception of behavior is inadequate for a number of reasons. First, on the mainstream view, the only correct description of a behavior is one such as: "He is holding his hand up, palm forward, to the side of his head." However, this conception provides no access to any other possible correct description, including all of the truly informative ones that go beyond the observationally obvious and that are virtually always at issue in actual human affairs. In restricting itself to observable physical movements (or sounds), psychology cannot technically generate even simple behavior descriptions such as: In raising his hand, he's... "swearing an oath"... "giving a Native American gesture of greeting"... "voting affirmatively on House Bill 206"... or "signaling that there are 5 minutes left". Second, the mainstream conception, strictly interpreted, would include involuntary bodily movements such as patellar reflex reactions as behavior. Third, it would leave out any sort of mental behavior such as solving an anagram "in one's head", especially when this was not initiated by any clear and present "stimulus" and did not issue in any observable outcome.

In the face of these perceived inadequacies, DP attempts to provide a more adequate formulation of the nature of behavior. First of all, it notes that all behavior represents "an attempt on the part of a person to effect a change from one state of affairs to another". A person combs her hair, drives to work, reads a book, makes herself a pot of coffee, and mentally calculates how many bottles of wine she will need for her upcoming party. In all of these simple behaviors, whether they involve overt physical movements or not, she is attempting to bring about a change from one state of affairs to another—to change her unkempt hair to a more presentable state, to shift from being unclear to being clear about how many bottles of wine she must purchase, and so forth. This characterization of behavior excludes phenomena such as patellar reflex movements, and includes acts such as mentally working on an anagram.

Going beyond this general characterization, DP maintains that human behavior is an empirical phenomenon that is amenable, not to definition, but to parametric analysis. (Compare: the concept "color" cannot be formally defined, but the phenomenon can be captured completely for scientific purposes by employing a system which specifies values for three parameters or dimensions: hue, saturation, and brightness.) In DP, any behavior is a complex state of affairs that has as constituents component states of affairs. (Compare: the state of affairs "car moving down the street" is a complex state of affairs the includes component states of affairs "engine running", "tires rotating", and much more).

In DP, whenever a behavior (e.g., John calling his girlfriend for a dinner date) is the case, something of each of the following kinds (i.e., the parameters) is ipso facto the case: something concerning whose action it is (I), what state of affairs was wanted (W), which distinctions/concepts were acted upon (K), what personal know-how came into play (K-H), what physical performances were involved (P), what difference the behavior made (A), what personal characteristics of the actor were expressed (PC), and what significance the behavior had (S). Lest there be any doubt about the necessity of any of these parameters, consider what happens if we try to dispense with any of them: "John called his girlfriend for a dinner date, but... no one made the call (I)... no distinctions were involved between telephones and other objects, invitations vs. other messages, etc. (K)... no outcome was sought (W)... no personal know-how came into play in the act (K-H)... no performance of a vocal or other sort took place (P)... nothing was different by virtue of the behavior occurring (A)... no personal characteristic of John's was expressed (PC)... or, finally, no more inclusive pattern of behavior (e.g. no courting behavior) was enacted by virtue of  enacting the behavior in question (S).

DP employs the following formalism to capture this idea:

B = Behavior: (e.g., the behavior of John calling his girlfriend for a dinner date)

I = Identity: the identity of the person whose behavior it is (e.g., John)

W = Want: the state of affairs which is to be brought about and which serves as the logical criterion for the success or failure of the behavior (e.g., having the invitation issued, getting his girlfriend's acceptance)

K = Know: the distinctions which are being made and acted on; the concepts being acted on (e.g., telephone vs. other objects, girlfriend vs. other persons, dining vs. other activities)

KH = Know-How: the competence that is being employed (e.g., skill at speaking English, at using the telephone, at issuing invitations)

P = Performance: the process, or procedural aspects of the behavior, including all bodily postures, movements, and processes which are involved in the behavior. This includes all of the physical processes entailed in John making the phone call, which could in principle be described at any level of analysis appropriate to the describer's needs, from molar vocal and manual grasping events, finer muscular events, molecular brain and other central nervous system events, etc.)

A = Achievement: the outcome of the behavior; the difference that the behavior makes (e.g., having the invitation issued, getting his girlfriend's acceptance)

PC = Personal Characteristics: the personal characteristics of which the behavior in question is an expression; these may include powers (abilities, knowledge, values), dispositions (traits, attitudes, interests, styles) or derivatives (capacities, embodiments, states, statuses; e.g., John's love for his girlfriend, his desire to spend time with her, and his preference for private, intimate, conversational dates)

S = Significance: the more inclusive patterns of behavior enacted by virtue of enacting the behavior in question (e.g., by extending his invitation, John participates in the broader social practices of dating and of courting a prospective life partner).

Parameters, in science or in everyday life, are a means by which we specify the ways in which one instance of a concept (e.g., a behavior or a color) can be the same as, or different from, another instance. If all of the values for two behaviors are identical, the behaviors are identical (compare: if hue, saturation and brightness are identical for two patches of color, they are the same color). If one or more values are different, the behaviors are different. For example, suppose that Terry and Pat engage in the same overt performance of uttering the words "I love you" to each other. However, the value of the W (Want) parameter for Terry is "to get Pat's money", while the value of the W parameter for Pat is "to express love for Terry". This parametric difference renders Terry's behavior a different behavior than Pat's. Colloquially, we characterize this difference by saying that Terry is "gold-digging", while Pat is "expressing love".

In principle, one could give an exhaustive description of any behavior by specifying all of the values of all of the above parameters. In practice, however, on any given occasion, whether scientific, therapeutic, or everyday interactional, persons make descriptive commitments to those parameters which serve their purposes in the giving of the specific description. They commit (at least) to the W parameter when they want to describe what Terry is doing as gold-digging. They commit to the K (Know / distinction made) parameter when they want to describe what Lauren is doing as a case of treating the remark she just heard as a joke rather than an insult. They commit to the PC (Personal Characteristic, subtype Trait) parameter when they want to characterize Senator Smith's vote on a child care bill as an expression of political ambition, not humanitarianism.

Thus, the DP formulation of behavior contrasts sharply with mainstream psychology's notion of behavior as observable physical movement. Unlike the latter, it provides entree to the descriptions of behavior that are virtually always at issue in human discourse; for example, questions regarding the nature of a person's behavior are virtually never requests for another to describe the already known visible movements that that person is making. It covers mental acts such as planning, calculating, or problem solving "in one's head", and excludes involuntary movements such as the patellar and eyeblink reflex actions. The DP conception does not require, like the mainstream view, the creation of some sort of human mechanics designed to causally reattach such things as motives, thoughts, or personality traits to the observable physical movements of persons. Finally, going well beyond what space permits here into matters that one can perhaps only glimpse from the foregoing discussion: the DP conception articulates the calculational system that persons in fact employ in the giving of behavior descriptions.

The concept of a "person"
The mainstream tendency in psychology has been to define "person" as the name of a certain kind of organism. A person is taken to be a highly evolved specimen of the species Homo sapiens, a species that via evolution has acquired certain physical features, most importantly a large, complex brain that renders this species capable of consciousness and higher mental accomplishments such as using language and solving complex logical problems.

The DP formulation of persons differs fundamentally from this. It begins by honoring the traditional intellectual custom of not defining things—things like chairs, automobiles, dollars, radios, chess pawns, and computers—in terms of what they are made of or of how this "stuff" is organized. They are defined instead in terms of what they do—the roles they play, the ways they function in the human scheme of things. A pawn, whether it be ivory, wood, or onyx, is something that functions a certain way in the game of chess. A computer, whether composed of ancient vacuum tubes or modern semiconductors, is a device for carrying out various operations involving the processing of information. A chair, whether wooden rocker or leather beanbag, is a piece of furniture designed to seat a single person.

Employing this functionalist approach, Ossorio defined a "person" as "...an individual whose history is paradigmatically a history of deliberate action". A person is an individual, in other words, that (paradigmatically) has the ability to behave in the full sense of that term—to engage in some behavior B, knowing that he or she is doing B rather than other behaviors that he or she distinguishes, and having chosen B as being the thing to do from among a set of distinguished behavioral alternatives. In the vernacular, such behavior is characterized as "knowing what you're doing and doing it on purpose." Such behaviors as making a carefully considered move in a board game, ordering from a restaurant menu, or phrasing a verbal reply so as not to offend another represent clear, everyday examples of deliberate actions. ("Paradigmatically" gets at the point that persons are not always engaging in deliberate action; e.g., when they are asleep or if they have been knocked unconscious.)

Defending this conception further against the view that "person" designates a certain kind of organism, DP argues that at one time the only kind of airplane was a wooden, propeller-driven one, and the only kind of computer was a vacuum tube model. At the present historical juncture, the only completely unarguable example of a person is homo sapiens type human beings. However, many scientists have long believed that there is a strong possibility that there are persons who are aliens, and extensive efforts have been made to establish communication with such persons. Further, another longstanding endeavor exists to create computers and robots with all of the features of humans. It is not beyond the realm of possibility that at some point ones are created that are capable of entertaining behavioral options and selecting from among them—i.e., computers that, like such cinematic  "characters" as Hal in 2001: A Space Odyssey, or R2-D2 in the Star Wars series, are persons. Third and finally, ongoing programs of research explore the linguistic, communicational, and behavioral capabilities of gorillas, chimpanzees, dolphins, and other infrahuman species. It is not beyond the realm of possibility that such creatures become regarded as persons. Even if none of these possibilities came to fruition, the conceptual point has already been made. Our concept of "person" is not confined to organisms with homo sapiens embodiment, but extends beyond it to any creature that exhibits a certain kind of functioning.

Individual persons. If a conceptual system for a science of psychology is to provide descriptive access to all facts and possible facts about persons and their behavior, it must do more than capture the concept of Person in general.  It must also provide descriptive resources for describing individual persons.  Psychologists, historians, biographers, and people leading their everyday social lives must distinguish persons, not merely on the basis of identity ("that's John Smith"), but on basis of what kind of persons they are.  DP provides the conceptual resources for doing so with the following parametric analysis, one again that captures what persons actually do in undertaking this essential life task:

Ds = Dispositions: the various inclinations or tendencies, ordinarily observable in a person by virtue of a pattern of frequency in their behavior. These include traits (dispositions to engage in a certain kind of behavior such as hostile or generous behavior); attitudes (dispositions to regard and treat different objects (e.g., the bible or a presidential candidate) or certain classes of object (e.g., liberals or conservatives) in certain characteristic ways (e.g., contemptuously or reverently); interests (dispositions to find certain topics (e.g., world affairs or sports) captivating; and styles (dispositions having to do, not with what a person does, but with how he or she does it (e.g., in a sophisticated, naïve, graceful, or awkward fashion).

P = Powers: concepts having to do with what is possible and not possible for a given person. These include the person's abilities (the person's capabilities with reference to some kind of achievement such as shooting a basketball, playing chess, or learning languages); knowledge (the set of facts the person has the ability to act on, such as the rules of chess or the requirements for making a good omelet); and values (the set of motivational priorities that the person is routinely able to act on, such as a value for honesty or for an adventurous way of life).

Dr = Derivatives: concepts which, unlike the two categories above, do not have a direct connection to behavior but are defined by their reference instead to dispositions and powers. These include states (states of affairs in which there is a systematic difference in the ordinary powers or dispositions of a person, such as being sick or exhausted or drunk); capacities (the potential to acquire personal characteristics, such as a capacity to acquire mathematical skills or to learn languages; and embodiment (the physical characteristics of a person, such as being six feet tall, weighing 180 pounds, or having brown eyes).

In essence, individuals characterize what kind of person John Smith is by giving values to these parameters. When they describe John as "honest," they commit to (one value of) the trait parameter; when "flamboyant" to the style parameter; when "obsessed with making money" to the values parameter; when "very good with numbers" to the ability parameter (of course, all of these parameters will have multiple values—honesty will not be John's only trait). And they are saying in essence: "This is the kind of behavior, style, motivational priority, ability, etc. that you can expect (not certainly but probabilistically) to observe in John."

Applications of the descriptive framework
The concepts of Behavior and Person are the two most basic concepts in the vast network of concepts that is DP. Given limitations of space, others will not be pursued here. In this section, attention is turned to some applications of DP. The method of presentation will be to provide brief excerpts from published works covering different topics to which DP has been applied. Regrettably, many of the linkages between these works and the concepts just discussed cannot be drawn here. While DP's conceptual analyses have in the past often struck readers as difficult, abstract, and even arcane, its ultimate products and applications have typically emerged as possessing a clear, concrete, common sensical character.

On the descriptive approach to psychotherapy
"As psychotherapists, our primary time-honored paths to change have been through modifying our clients' behaviors, cognitions, insights into unconscious factors, and patterns of interaction with significant others. This book presents a further powerful therapeutic option – that of bringing about changes in our clients' statuses, an approach referred to as 'status dynamics'."

"The status dynamic therapist occupies a world of places. Our particular interest is in places that carry power – places from which our clients can act effectively in their worlds to bring about personal change. And, as active agents of change, our interest is in helping our clients to occupy such positions of power. We would like to position them to fight downhill battles and not uphill ones, to be 'in the driver's seat' and not the passenger one. We would like them to approach their problems as proactive, in-control actors and not helpless victims. We would like them to attack these problems from the position of acceptable, sense-making, care-meriting persons who bring ample strengths, resources, and past successes to the solution of their difficulties. We would like them to proceed from reconstructed worlds, and from places within these worlds, in which they are eligible and able to participate in life in meaningful and fulfilling ways."

On the therapeutic relationship

"The plot of the 1938 film classic, Boys Town, may be helpful in understanding the positive therapeutic relationship as conceived in a status dynamic way. In this loosely biographical film, a priest, Father Flanagan, runs a community charged with the care of boys who have been in trouble with the law. His core philosophy is expressed in the motto, "There's no such thing as a bad boy." Consistent with this philosophy, Father Flanagan pre-conceives each new boy who enters Boys' Town to be at heart a good boy – in other words, he does so, not on the basis of observation, but a priori. Furthermore, there is almost nothing the boy can do to change the priest's view of him. Should the boy misbehave in some manner, this is always seen by Father Flanagan, in one way or another, as a bad or misguided act by a good boy. It is never taken as grounds to reconsider the young man's basic status as a good person."

"Father Flanagan's philosophy infuses all of his actions toward his boys. Not only does he view them as good, but he unfailingly treats them as such. Because the boys regard him as a highly estimable and credible person, his unwavering treatment of them as good eventually leads them to view themselves as he views them. In their own eyes, they become basically good people. Finally, with this recasting of themselves as acceptable individuals, they rethink their basic eligibilities in society. From outcaste positions – "delinquents", "bad seeds", "losers", and the like – they see themselves as having moved to positions of full membership in society, and with this as having acquired the enhanced eligibilities for relationships, vocations, and ways of life that go with this new position."

"This story illustrates an informal version of what Ossorio has termed an "accreditation ceremony". In such ceremonies, one person, who occupies a position of high status and credibility, regards other individuals in a highly affirming and accrediting way, and steadfastly treats them accordingly. This accrediting treatment benefits these individuals when they accept the statuses assigned, resulting in significantly enhanced conceptions of themselves and their eligibilities to participate in society."

"Conceived as an ongoing, informal version of such an accreditation ceremony, the positive therapeutic relationship comprises the following elements:
 The therapist assigns certain accrediting statuses to the client on an a priori basis.
 The therapist treats the client accordingly.
 The client regards the therapist as a credible status assigner.
 The client recognizes the status assignments that the therapist is making.
 The client accepts the therapist's status assignments; that is, appraises himself or herself in these ways."

On worlds and world reconstruction
"Worlds that individuals must negotiate are not once and forever things. Your place in the world must be maintained or improved or it may be lost. ...A person not only constructs and maintains a world, but also can reconstruct that world in ways that give him or her more behavior potential." Note: "Behavior potential is a principal DP term which refers to your range of "options," i.e. the choices open to you.

"...If a person turns to a Descriptive psychotherapist for help, the Descriptive therapist, operating in accordance with the choice principles for doing psychotherapy and status dynamic maxims developed by Peter G. Ossorio, looks to see what it is about a client's world formulation that is leaving the client in an impossible position. After identifying the problem, the therapist comes up with a reformulation of the client's world, a reformulation that opens up new possibilities and alternatives for the client."

On self-concepts and self-concept change
"On the present account, an individual's self-concept is conceived as that individual's summary formulation of his or her status. This conception differs significantly from traditional ones in which the self-concept is universally considered to be a kind of organized informational summary of perceived facts about oneself, including such things as one's traits, values, social roles, interests, physical characteristics, and personal history. For this reason, and because the notion of 'status' will be unfamiliar to most readers, this section will be devoted to explaining the present conception."

"A helpful means for making the transition from thinking in informational summary terms to thinking in status terms is to consider what we might naturally say to a child if we were teaching her the game of chess. Suppose that we have a board set up, the pieces arrayed in a mid-game situation, and we are explaining what a 'knight' is. In doing so, it is highly unlikely that we would use an informational summary approach, which would include telling her such things as that our knights were made of onyx, weighed 2 ounces, were forty years old, and were made in Mexico. Rather, we would provide her with information that has to do with the knight's place or position in the total scheme of things. Thus, we would describe what a knight is by informing her of its relationships to the other pieces in the game (e.g., its ability to capture them, to block their movements, to move vis-a-vis them only in a certain distinctive fashion, etc.). Further, looking at any given knight's position relative to other pieces in the game situation displayed, we would help her to understand its current strategic importance. The crucial point here is that our thinking about the knight, indeed our thinking about what it is to be a knight, is quintessentially relational or positional in nature. When we have completed our description, what we have given our child is a summary formulation of the knight's status—its overall place in the scheme of things—not an informational summary of many different kinds of facts about knights."

"Returning from chess pieces to persons, the status dynamic view maintains that the self-concept is most usefully identified, not with an organized summary of myriad perceived facts about oneself, but with one's summary formulation of one's status. That is to say, it is one's overall conception of one's place or position in relation to all of the elements in one's world, including oneself. In a simple and humorous, yet illuminating, illustration of this notion, cartoon character Charlie Brown once lamented that he was unable to initiate a relationship with a little girl on the playground because 'I'm a nothing and she's a something'. He then went on to relate that, if he were a 'something', or she a 'nothing', he could pursue her, but that, since 'nothings' cannot hope to succeed with 'somethings', he could not act. In this example, Charlie provides us with a simplified illustration of the self-concept as a summary formulation of one's status ('nothing' existing in a world made up of 'somethings' and 'nothings'); and illustrates how what is fundamental about self-concepts is not that they are informational summaries of myriad facts about oneself, but that they place one somewhere in the scheme of things."

On love and barriers to love

"It is vitally important that psychotherapists bring a strong understanding of the nature of love to their work with the many clients who are struggling, in one way or another, with love relationships. With this in mind, the present paper is designed to accomplish two purposes. The first of these is to provide an adequate answer to an old and perplexing question: "What is romantic love?", and to do so in a way that illuminates why this one relationship possesses the extraordinary importance and centrality in human existence that it so clearly does. The second is to identify and discuss the most common barriers to persons being able to love that are encountered in clinical practice."

"To say that "Romeo loves Juliet" (or vice versa) in the romantic sense of that term is to say that Romeo has a certain kind of relationship to Juliet. This relationship is one in which he has given Juliet a certain kind of place, or status, in his world. This place is one of extraordinary honor, value, and centrality; and is perhaps the ultimate such place that one human being can bestow upon another. In the giving of it, which at the outset has the quality, not of choosing, but of "falling" in love, a highly affirming relationship is established between Romeo and Juliet. The characteristics of this relationship will be the subject of this section."

"...Singer articulates this dimension of love (investment in the well-being of the other) well when he says: 'The lover takes an interest in the beloved as a person, and not merely as a commodity... He bestows importance on her needs and her desires, even when they do not further the satisfaction of his own... In relation to the lover, the beloved has become valuable for her own sake' (p. 6). In love, then, Juliet is invested in the well-being of Romeo for his own sake, and not merely for how his well-being might benefit her. In Kantian terms, he has become for her an 'end' and not merely a 'means' to her ends. Such an investment in the well-being of the beloved is expressed as a willingness to act—and even to give one's utmost if need be—on behalf of the beloved. This might include such things as acting to further his interests and goals, supporting or assisting him in times of need, and avoiding or preventing anything from happening that would harm or hurt him. In love, Romeo is not for Juliet a mere 'commodity'—is not an entity that, like her automobile or her garage mechanic, has a place in her world which consists essentially of satisfying her needs. (This is not to say, of course, that in any relationship there is not some admixture of love and self-interest.)"

"If love has an essential characteristic, it is this feature of investment in the well-being of the beloved for his or her own sake. It is the one characteristic that transcends all of the different varieties of personal love such as romantic love, parental love, brotherly love, deep friendship, and Christian love or 'agape'. Conceptually, consider the contradiction inherent in saying of any alleged love relationship: 'She loves him, but she has little interest in his well-being, and values him only insofar as he can satisfy her needs' (cf. 'She loves him, but her investment in him is entirely narcissistic.')"

"...In this section, a number of important barriers to persons being able to love that are encountered frequently in clinical practice will be discussed. Gleaned from the author's 31 years of clinical experience, from research, and from the observations of other clinicians, some of these barriers represent limitations that are confined primarily to one of the parameters of love, while others affect the entirety of them. These barriers are, in the order that they will be discussed, (a) an inability to understand and treat persons as persons, (b) a lack of understanding and appreciation for love itself, (c) personal needs or motives that preclude deep investment in the person of another, (d) hypercritical tendencies that interfere with respecting and admiring others, and (e) senses of personal ineligibility for the love of other persons."

On clinical approaches to persons who find life meaningless

"Consider the excellent example of an absurd world captured in the following suicide note: 'Imagine a happy group of morons who are engaged in work. They are carrying bricks in an open field. As soon as they have stacked all the bricks at one end of the field, they proceed to transport them to the opposite end. This continues without stop and every day of every year they are busy doing the same thing. One day one of the morons stops long enough to ask himself what he is doing. He wonders what purpose there is in carrying the bricks.  And from that point on, he is not quite as content with his occupation as he had been before. I am the moron who wonders why he is carrying the bricks.' "

"This description, highly reminiscent of Camus' classical description of Sisyphus, may be usefully contrasted with our paradigm case of meaningful action. When viewed thus, what emerges is that the absurd world it describes is the diametric opposite of our paradigm case. The man's precise complaint is that, in the world as he finds it, there is no instrumental, intrinsic, or spiritual significance. His actions, analogized as a pointless carrying of bricks back and forth, accomplish no valued utilitarian end that he can detect. They possess no intrinsic value for him. And, unlike Sisyphus, he can find no spiritual or transcendent value in the activity that might enable him to endure or even to affirm it. The absurd, the quintessence of meaninglessness, is precisely what is generated when instrumental, intrinsic, and spiritual value are missing from human behavior."

On the treatment of sexual addiction
"The central theses comprising the present theory are the following: (1) Sexually compulsive individuals are obsessed with the enactment of certain preferred sexual scenarios. (2) These preferred scenarios have their origins in early experiences of degradation, and represent attempts to recover from this degradation. They embody interpersonal transactions that, were they to occur in reality, would (or so persons envision) lift them from their degraded positions among other persons to new and more viable ones, and in so doing convey personal redemption and recovery. (3) These scenarios function as impossible standards against which compulsive individuals measure their actual relationships, activities, and achievements, with the result that the latter are found not to measure up and thus not to satisfy them. (4) Finally, these recovery attempts are unsuccessful. While momentarily gratifying, they do not in fact bring about recovery, and typically leave their enactors feeling more degraded than before. Thus, they engender ever greater needs to reenact the preferred sexual scenario in the future, and set up a compulsive cycle."

On the treatment of bulimia nervosa
"Bulimic binge eating represents a rebellious reaction against ... coercive and self-disregarding methods of familial and self governance. Bulimic purging represents a reinstatement of the coercive regime, and sets the stage for further rebellion in the future. A critical practical implication of this formulation is that therapeutic emphasis should be placed on changing the self-governance strategies of bulimic individuals.

On organizations
"An organization is a human community, and therefore is characterized [in terms of its parameters] fundamentally by its members, practices, statuses, choice principles, concepts, locutions, and world. An organization exists for the accomplishment of its mission—a specific, valued state of affairs—and its core practices are directly related to mission. The mission provides both pragmatically and ethically an anchoring point for the choice principles of the organization. A special mission-related status, that of manager, exists to see to the effective and efficient pursuit of the mission; authority is invested in managers for the accomplishment of mission, and all other members agree to subordinate their independent agency to management authority. Members are either part of the line—directly involved in accomplishing the mission—or staff, involved in supporting the line. The world of the organization looks different depending on which systematic logic one uses: three important organizational worlds are those in which people, machines and numbers are the ultimate objects."

On spirituality and religion
"I would suggest that the spiritual domain is anchored in these notions (i.e., ultimates, totalities, and boundary conditions). You're into the spiritual domain when you ask ultimate questions—'what's the ultimate meaning of life?', when you deal with totalities—'What is the entire world like? What is my whole life like? How should I live my whole life?' And 'boundary conditions' is a little harder to explain, but think in terms of, "When have I reached the limit?" For example, if I tell you that I know something, you may ask me how I know and I may be able to give you an answer. Then when I give you the answer, that has to be something else that I know, and so you may ask me about it, and I may give you an answer. But ultimately, we reach some kind of end because I can't give you answers forever. All knowledge has that structure, that you can back up some knowledge with other knowledge, and you can back that up with some other, but there is never an infinite sequence of backing up. You do reach an end point. The fact that you reach an end point is an example of a boundary condition with respect to knowledge, that knowledge is not founded on an infinite set of foundations, nor is it founded on a secure foundation.  A secure foundation is just some other fact that one can ask questions about. So knowledge starts somewhere, and it doesn't start from further knowledge, ultimately. And it's in dealing with such questions as, 'Where does our knowledge come from?  What is its foundations?  What kind of confidence can we have in it?' – these kinds of questions, I think are what you're dealing with when you think of a religion."

"I think of a religion as a theory in this domain. A religion is one that primarily provides answers to these kinds of questions. And because it works that way, you can operate in this domain from understanding and ability without a specifically religious doctrine..."

On consciousness
"An approach to conceptualizing, analyzing, and formally representing the phenomenon of consciousness is developed. The basis of the approach is the State of Affairs System. The State of Affairs System formulation provides a conceptual and technical basis for formal, rigorous, but non-reductionist descriptions of the real world, including a person acting in the world. With this formulation, consciousness can be formulated as C = <I, W, P>, where I is the individual whose consciousness this is, W is the world the person is conscious of, and P is the position in that world that the person is conscious as. Experience and feelings are shown to be aspects of the relationship between a person and their world, specifically of the unique position a person occupies in their world. A Consciousness Change Formula is presented, which specifies in terms of actions and worlds the principles that govern consciousness change. The formulation is used to address (1) how consciousness arises, (2) the physical basis for consciousness, (3) the rigorous but non-reductionist scientific study of consciousness, and (4) the possibility of computer-based consciousness."

On cognitive psychology
"This paper, grounded in an intellectual framework known as Descriptive Psychology, will have the following structure. First, I will articulate more formally the mainstream point of view and program of contemporary cognitive psychology regarding underlying cognitive micro-processes. Second, I will critique this point of view. To anticipate, I will argue that the primary problem is with a critical part of what might be termed its 'software program'—in particular, its attempt to discover nature's underlying, unconscious, and in principle unobservable cognitive micro-processes—as opposed to its 'hardware' program that concerns itself with the biological structures, processes, and events involved in various kinds of human mental acts. Third and finally, I shall comment on the latter program, cognitive neuropsychology, not with respect to the considerable value of what it has and undoubtedly will discover in the future, but with respect to the interpretation that would appropriately be placed on its findings."

References

External links
 Society for Descriptive Psychology
 Psychology terms